The 1995 Stanley Cup playoffs, the playoff tournament of the National Hockey League was played between May 6 and June 24, 1995. The 1994–95 NHL regular season was shortened to 48 games, and the playoffs pushed to a later date, due to a lockout. The sixteen teams that qualified, eight from each conference, played best-of-seven series for the conference quarterfinals, semifinals and championships, and then the conference champions played a best-of-seven series for the Stanley Cup. In the Finals, the New Jersey Devils swept the favored Detroit Red Wings in four games to win their first championship.

This was the only time Patrick Roy missed the playoffs in his career. His team, the Montreal Canadiens, missed the playoffs for the first time since 1970. The Canadiens and the Ottawa Senators missed the playoffs this year. Montreal and Ottawa did not miss the playoffs in the same year again until 2016, when all Canadian teams missed the playoffs. The Quebec Nordiques played their last playoff series during this time. They would move to Denver, Colorado during the summer. For the first time since 1980, no league semifinal/conference final games were played in Canada.

Playoff seeds

The following teams qualified for the playoffs:

Eastern Conference
 Quebec Nordiques, Northeast Division champions, Eastern Conference regular season champions – 65 points
 Philadelphia Flyers, Atlantic Division champions – 60 points
 Pittsburgh Penguins – 61 points
 Boston Bruins – 57 points
 New Jersey Devils – 52 points (22 wins, 7 points head-to-head vs. Washington)
 Washington Capitals – 52 points (22 wins, 1 point head-to-head vs. New Jersey)
 Buffalo Sabres – 51 points
 New York Rangers – 47 points

Western Conference
 Detroit Red Wings, Central Division champions, Western Conference regular season champions, Presidents' Trophy winners – 70 points
 Calgary Flames, Pacific Division champions – 55 points
 St. Louis Blues – 61 points
 Chicago Blackhawks – 53 points
 Toronto Maple Leafs – 50 points
 Vancouver Canucks – 48 points
 San Jose Sharks – 42 points (19 wins)
 Dallas Stars – 42 points (17 wins)

Playoff bracket

Conference Quarterfinals

Eastern Conference Quarterfinals

(1) Quebec Nordiques vs. (8) New York Rangers

This was the first playoff meeting between these two teams. This was the final playoff series played by the Quebec Nordiques, as they relocated to Denver, Colorado to become the Colorado Avalanche the next season. Game five was the final NHL game played at the Quebec Coliseum.

(2) Philadelphia Flyers vs. (7) Buffalo Sabres

This was the third playoff meeting between these two teams; with Philadelphia winning both previous series. They last met in the 1978 Stanley Cup Quarterfinals, which Philadelphia won in five games. Game four was the last playoff game at Buffalo Memorial Auditorium.

(3) Pittsburgh Penguins vs. (6) Washington Capitals
This was the second consecutive and fourth overall playoff meeting between these two teams; with Pittsburgh winning two of the three previous series. Washington won last year's playoff meeting in six games.

With their win in game seven, the Pens became the first team to have two 3–1 comebacks in a playoff series against the same team.

(4) Boston Bruins vs. (5) New Jersey Devils

This was the second consecutive and third overall playoff meeting between these two teams; with the teams splitting the two previous series. New Jersey won last year's playoff meeting in six games.

Game five was the last game played in the Boston Garden.

Western Conference Quarterfinals

(1) Detroit Red Wings vs. (8) Dallas Stars
This was the second playoff meeting between these two teams; with Detroit winning the only previous series. They last met in the 1992 Norris Division Semifinals, which Detroit won in seven games against the Minnesota North Stars.

(2) Calgary Flames vs. (7) San Jose Sharks
This was the first playoff meeting between these two teams. Calgary set an NHL record by scoring 35 goals, the most by any team in a seven-game series. The 35 goals is also the highest number of goals ever scored by a team that lost a series in NHL history. A total of 61 goals were scored in the series, the highest total between both teams in a seven-game series in NHL history.

(3) St. Louis Blues vs. (6) Vancouver Canucks
This was first playoff meeting between these two teams.

(4) Chicago Blackhawks vs. (5) Toronto Maple Leafs
This was the second consecutive and ninth overall playoff meeting between these two teams; with Toronto winning six of the eight previous series. Toronto won last year's playoff meeting in six games.

Conference Semifinals

Eastern Conference Semifinals

(2) Philadelphia Flyers vs. (8) New York Rangers
This was the ninth playoff meeting between these two teams; with the teams splitting the eight previous series. They last met in the 1987 Patrick Division Semifinals, which Philadelphia won in six games.

(3) Pittsburgh Penguins vs. (5) New Jersey Devils
This was the third playoff meeting between these two teams; with Pittsburgh winning both previous series. They last met in the 1993 Patrick Division Semifinals, which Pittsburgh won in five games.

Western Conference Semifinals

(1) Detroit Red Wings vs. (7) San Jose Sharks
This was the second consecutive and second overall playoff meeting between these two teams. San Jose won last year's playoff meeting in seven games.

(4) Chicago Blackhawks vs. (6) Vancouver Canucks

This was the second playoff meeting between these two teams; with Vancouver winning the only previous series. They last met in the 1982 Clarence Campbell Conference Final, which Vancouver won in five games.

Game four was the last game played in the Pacific Coliseum.

Conference Finals

Eastern Conference Final

(2) Philadelphia Flyers vs. (5) New Jersey Devils

This was the second playoff series between these two teams, with Philadelphia winning the only previous meeting in two games. They last met in the 1978 Preliminary Round where Philadelphia swept the Colorado Rockies. This was the third Conference Final appearance for New Jersey and the second consecutive appearance after losing to the New York Rangers in seven games the year before. Philadelphia made their fourth Conference Final appearance and first since losing to Montreal in six games in 1989.

New Jersey handed Philadelphia their first two playoff home losses of the season winning 4–1 in game one and 5–2 in game two and they outshot the Flyers 28–21 and 24–20 respectively. In game three Philadelphia played with a sense of urgency. Trailing 2–1 the Flyers tied the game on Rod Brind'Amour's goal with 6:03 to go in regulation. They went on to win the game 3–2 on captain Eric Lindros' goal at 4:19 of the first overtime period. Playing with their newfound confidence the Flyers won game four by a score of 4–2 despite being outshot 34–19, Flyers goaltender Ron Hextall made 32 saves. In game five the Devils took a 2–1 lead into the second period which ended up scoreless. The Flyers tied the game on Kevin Dineen's second goal of the game at 3:13 of the third period. The Devils almost regained the lead on Stephane Richer's breakaway shot that hit the crossbar with less than four minutes to go in regulation. Then with less than a minute remaining Devils forward Claude Lemieux picked up the puck on a backcheck in the New Jersey zone and skated up the ice, once over the Flyers' blue line Lemieux fired a slap shot that beat Hextall on his blocker side. The goal silenced the Spectrum crowd and gave New Jersey a 3–2 lead with just 44.2 seconds to play. The Devils hung on to win the game 3–2.

In game six Philadelphia opened the scoring on Jim Montgomery's goal at 4:05 of the first period. The Devils calmly utilized the neutral-zone trap to shut down the Flyers' offense while their forwards took advantage. Stephane Richer tied the game with a power play goal at 10:25 and Brian Rolston put the Devils up 2–1 with a goal at 18:15. The scored remained 2–1 for New Jersey until midway through the second period. After a blocked shot by Devils defenceman Shawn Chambers led to a three on one rush for New Jersey, Randy McKay scored his seventh goal of the postseason. The Devils made it 4–1 at 10:11 of the third period when Bobby Carpenter passed the puck past Flyers defenceman Karl Dykhuis up to Claude Lemieux at center ice who went in on a breakaway and scored his league leading eleventh goal of the playoffs. The Flyers fought back as Mikael Renberg scored on the power play at 16:29 to cut the Devils' lead to 4–2 but New Jersey held on to the lead and went on to win the game and series, advancing to the Stanley Cup Finals for the first time in team history.

Western Conference Final

(1) Detroit Red Wings vs. (4) Chicago Blackhawks

This was the 14th playoff series between these two teams, with Chicago winning eight of the thirteen previous series. They last met in the 1992 Norris Division Final where Chicago swept Detroit in four games. This was the seventh conference final appearance for Chicago and first since 1992 where the Blackhawks swept Edmonton in four games. Detroit made their third conference final appearance and first since losing to Edmonton in five games in 1988.

Game one of the series at the Joe Louis Arena in Detroit saw a goaltending battle between Ed Belfour and Mike Vernon. The two teams skated to a 1–1 tie after regulation before Nicklas Lidstrom scored the game-winning goal for Detroit at 1:01 of the first overtime period. It was the first overtime playoff game that Detroit had won at home since 1960. In game two Chicago led by a score of 2–1 after two periods on goals by Chris Chelios and Tony Amonte. In the third period, Detroit kept pressing and eventually tied the game on Doug Brown's goal. Kris Draper scored the winner for Detroit with just 1:45 remaining in regulation. In game three of the series at the United Center, Detroit led 3–2 going into the third period. Jeff Shantz scored at 8:33 to tie the game for Chicago. The game went to double overtime where Vladimir Konstantinov scored the game-winner for Detroit at 9:25. The win gave the Red Wings a commanding 3–0 series lead. The Blackhawks responded to the urgency and came out flying in game four as Denis Savard and Joe Murphy both scored twice and captain Dirk Graham had a goal to give Chicago a dominating 5–0 lead after 40 minutes. Detroit scored twice in the third period on goals by Kris Draper and Ray Sheppard as the Blackhawks went on to win the game 5–2. In game five Chicago jumped out to a 1–0 lead on Denis Savard's power play goal at 10:18 of the first period. Detroit then tied the game on captain Steve Yzerman's goal at 11:36 of the second. After a scoreless third period the game went into double overtime where Vyacheslav Kozlov scored at 2:25 to give the Red Wings a 2–1 win and a series clinching victory.

Stanley Cup Finals

This was the first playoff meeting between these two teams. Detroit made their nineteenth appearance in the Finals, and first since 1966 where they lost to the Montreal Canadiens in six games. New Jersey made their first Finals appearance in their twenty-first season after entering the league in 1974 as the Kansas City Scouts. Detroit last won the Stanley Cup in 1955.

Playoff statistics

Skaters
These are the top ten skaters based on points.

Goaltenders
This is a combined table of the top five goaltenders based on goals against average and the top five goaltenders based on save percentage, with at least 420 minutes played. The table is sorted by GAA, and the criteria for inclusion are bolded.

References

See also
1994–95 NHL season
List of NHL seasons

Play
Stanley Cup playoffs